The Golden Bridge is a 1956 West German drama film directed by Paul Verhoeven and starring Ruth Leuwerik, Curd Jürgens and Paul Hubschmid. It was shot at the Bavaria Studios in Munich. The film's sets were designed by the art director Max Mellin.

Cast
 Ruth Leuwerik as Tima
 Curd Jürgens as Balder
 Paul Hubschmid as Stefan
 Jester Naefe as Ann
 Rudolf Vogel as Hoppe
 Adrienne Gessner as Tante Jula
 Armin Dahlen as Hellborg
 Alexander Golling as Bessing
 Paul Verhoeven as Filmregisseur

References

Bibliography 
 Bock, Hans-Michael & Bergfelder, Tim. The Concise CineGraph. Encyclopedia of German Cinema. Berghahn Books, 2009.

External links 
 

1956 films
West German films
German drama films
1956 drama films
1950s German-language films
Films directed by Paul Verhoeven (Germany)
Gloria Film films
Films shot at Bavaria Studios
Films based on Hungarian novels
1950s German films
German black-and-white films